Hungarian Judo Association (MJSZ) is the governing body for the sport of judo in Hungary.

International competitions in Hungary
World Championships:
2017 World Judo Championships – Budapest, 28 August – 3 September

European Championships:
1981 European Judo Championships – Debrecen, 14–17 May
2013 European Judo Championships – Budapest, 25–28 April

International achievements

Olympic Games

World Championships

European Championships

Notable judokas
Men's

Women's

External links
Magyar Judo Szövetség (official website) 

Judo in Hungary
Judo organizations
Judo
Sports organizations established in 1957